The Hera Borghese is a type of sculpture of Hera named after the owners of its archetype, the Borghese family.  One example is in the National Museum of Rome, whilst others are in the Palatine Antiquarium and at the Castello Aragonese Museum at Baiae.

References

Hera
Borghese
Collections of the National Roman Museum
Hellenistic-style Roman sculptures
Archaeological discoveries in Italy